Tongyong Airlines was a charter airline based in China.

History
Tongyong Airlines was founded in the 1990s (year unknown), it operated a Yakovlev Yak-42 for charter flights. one was hijacked while en route to Nanjing, the airline ceased operations after merging into China Eastern Airlines.

Fleet
Before merging into China Eastern Airlines, Tongyong Airlines operated:
 Yakovlev Yak-42

Accidents and incidents
 On December 23, 1994, a Yakovlev Yak-42 was hijacked over Fuzhou, the hijacker demanded to be taken to Taiwan, the hijacker was knocked down and was overpowered, the aircraft returned to Xiamen where the hijacker was arrested.

References

Defunct airlines of China
Airlines disestablished in 1997